Chicamocha River is a river of Boyacá and Santander in central-eastern Colombia. It is part of the Magdalena river system that flows into the Caribbean Sea.

The Chicamocha River rises in the municipality of Tuta in the Department of Boyacá, flows through the Department of Santander and joins the Suárez River (with its tributary Fonce River) to form the Sogamoso River.

Chicamocha National Park 
The Chicamocha Canyon contains the Chicamocha National Park (PANACHI; Parque Nacional del Chicamocha), a major tourist destination in Colombia. It was preselected for the election of New 7 Wonders of Nature.

Gallery

See also 

 List of rivers of Colombia
 Chicamocha Canyon
 Guane people

References

External links 
 Elections 7 new natural wonders of the world
 Satellite photo of the Chicamocha Canyon, Pescadero sectorWikiMapia
  Albesiano, Sofía y J. Orlando Rangel-Ch. 2003. La vegetación del cañón del río Chicamocha (Santander, Colombia). Caldasia, 25(1):73-99

Videos 
 Parque Nacional del Chicamocha
 Official video Parque Nacional del Chicamocha 2009

Rivers of Colombia
Rivers
Rivers
Rivers
Muysccubun